Texas Panhandle is a 1945 American Western film directed by Ray Nazarro and written by Ed Earl Repp. The film stars Charles Starrett, Tex Harding, Dub Taylor, Nanette Parks, Carolina Cotton and Spade Cooley. The film was released on December 20, 1945, by Columbia Pictures.

Plot

Cast          
Charles Starrett as Steve Buckner / The Durango Kid
Tex Harding as Tex Harding
Dub Taylor as Cannonball Taylor
Nanette Parks as Ann Williams
Carolina Cotton as Carolina
Spade Cooley as Spade
Forrest Taylor as Ace Galatin
George Chesebro as Slash
Ted Mapes as Trig
Edward Howard as Dinero
Jody Gilbert as Millicent
William Gould as James Harrington
Jack Kirk as Bristow
Budd Buster as Martin
Hugh Hooker as Shorty

References

External links
 

1945 films
1940s English-language films
American Western (genre) films
1945 Western (genre) films
Columbia Pictures films
Films directed by Ray Nazarro
American black-and-white films
1940s American films